10P, 10-P or 10.P may refer to:

 AMX-10P, a French Army tank
 10P/Tempel, a comet
 British ten pence coin
 10th Planet Jiu-Jitsu

ja:10P